
Telephone numbers in Kazakhstan are regulated under the auspices of the Telecommunications Committee of the Ministry of Digital Development, Innovations, and Aerospace Industry in the Republic of Kazakhstan. They are administered by telecommunication providers, notably  Kazakhtelecom, a state-backed and the largest national operator.

Kazakhstan participates in international telecommunication services as a member of the International Telecommunication Union (ITU) and has been assigned the country code 997, which is governed by ITU recommendations E.164 and E.123. This country code replaces Russia's code 7, which has been in use for routing international calls to the country since the breakup of the Soviet Union,  The new country code was installed in January 2023, and a permissive dialing period is in effect until 2025, during which access via the Russian country code is possible.

History
Following the break-up of the Soviet Union, Russia and Kazakhstan retained the same country code 7 for inbound calling. Under an agreement with Russia signed on 11 June 2006, Kazakhstan was assigned zone codes 6xx and 7xx (x = 0 to 9) under the unified plan.

Geographical numbers 
Geographical (landline) telephone numbers in Kazakhstan consist of ten digits:
zone code: the leading three digits
area code: the following one or two digits
subscriber number: the last six or five digits, depending on the length of the area code.
Geographic numbers use zone codes in the range from 710 to 729.  Prior to the 2006 agreement, landlines used zone codes in the 3xx range; as zone codes 3xx were assigned to Russia, zone codes in Kazakhstan were changed by substituting the leading '3' with '7' in mid-2007.

Non-geographical numbers 
Non-geographical numbers start with 75x or 76x.

Mobile numbers 
Mobile numbers have 10 digits starting with 70x or 77x.

Dialling procedures

Local and national dialling 
Calls within a single area code can be made by dialling the 7-digit subscriber number alone. For long-distance calls, callers from landline numbers dial the long distance prefix 8, wait for a tone, and then dial the zone code and number. Modern exchanges no longer require waiting for the tone, nor does mobile telephony where the long-distance prefix is not required.

International dialling 
The international dialling prefix is 8~10 – callers dial 8, wait for a tone, and then dial 10 immediately followed by the country code and the remainder of the number. Modern exchanges no longer require waiting for the tone.

Country code 
On 1 January 2023, Kazakhstan began using country code 997, assigned by the International Telecommunication Union in 2021. The existing county code 7, shared with Russia, may be used under permissive dialling through 2024.

See also
Telephone numbers in Russia

References 

Kazakhstan
Communications in Kazakhstan
Kazakhstan communications-related lists